United States gubernatorial elections were held on November 2, 1982, in 36 states and two territories. The Democratic party had a net gain of seven seats. This election coincided with the Senate and the House elections.

Election results
A bolded state name features an article about the specific election.

States

Territories and federal district

See also
1982 United States elections
1982 United States Senate elections
1982 United States House of Representatives elections

Notes

References